Odd Bohlin Borgersen (born 10 April 1980) is a Norwegian long track speed skater who participates in international competitions.

Personal records

Career highlights

World Single Distance Championships
2005 - Inzell, 5th at 5000 m
2005 - Inzell, 5th at 10000 m
2005 - Inzell,  3rd at team pursuit
European Allround Championships
2008 - Kolomna,  19th
World Junior Allround Championships
1999 - Geithus, 24th
National Championships
2002 - Hundorp,  2nd at 5000 m
2003 - Geithus,  3rd at 10000 m
2004 - Oslo,  2nd at allround
2005 - Larvik,  2nd at 10000 m
2006 - Arendal,  3rd at allround
Nordic Neo Senior Games
2002 - Geithus,  3rd at 10000 m

External links
Borgersen at Jakub Majerski's Speedskating Database
Borgersen at SkateResults.com

1980 births
Norwegian male speed skaters
Living people
21st-century Norwegian people